is a very small asteroid and near-Earth object of the Apollo group, approximately  in diameter. Like , it is in a co-orbital configuration relative to Earth moving in a 1:1 mean-motion resonance. It was first observed on 13 April 2001, by astronomers with the LINEAR program at the Lincoln Lab's ETS near Socorro, New Mexico, in the United States.  has not been observed since its short four-day observation period in April 2001.

Description 

With an orbital period of 369 days,  is in a near 1:1 orbital resonance with Earth, and also has about the same orbit around the Sun as Earth. Unlike most near-Earth asteroids that simply fly by when they approach Earth, the Earth catches up with this asteroid from behind so that the asteroid then pauses in the vicinity of Earth. While in the vicinity of Earth, the asteroid moves in a helical (corkscrew) pattern that resembles an orbit around the Earth, like the Earth has a new moon. But it is not really a moon, because the asteroid is not gravitationally bound to the Earth, and eventually the asteroid moves on away from Earth and continues its orbit around the Sun.  was in this helical pattern from about 1997 to 2005, making the closest approach to Earth on 6 April 2001, and will not make another close approach until 2092.

The asteroid probably has a horseshoe orbit, but this has not been proven because the orbit was determined from only 5 days worth of observation. The Jupiter Tisserand invariant, used to distinguish different kinds of orbits, is 6.033.

See also 
 3753 Cruithne (1986 TO)
 
 
 
 
 
 Orbital resonance

References

External links 
 
 
 

Minor planet object articles (unnumbered)

20010413